Christopher Sheppard is a British film producer who has produced Oscar-nominated films. He co-founded Adventure Pictures with Sally Potter in 1990, the shingle has operated ever since. He is known for conglomerating independent film companies from a wide span of countries for his productions.

Producer credits
Orlando (1992)
The Tango Lesson (1997)
The Man Who Cried (2000)
Eisenstein (2000, executive)
Yes (2004)
Rage (2009)
Ginger & Rosa (2012)
The Party (2017)
The Roads Not Taken (2020)

References

External links

Year of birth missing (living people)
Living people
British film producers